Dioscorides (Greek: Διοσκουρίδης, Dioskourídēs; 3rd century BC) was a Greek epigrammatist of the Hellenistic period.

Life 
Dioscorides seems, from the internal evidence of his epigrams, to have lived in Egypt, about the time of Ptolemy Euergetes.

Works 
Dioscorides was the author of thirty-nine epigrams in the Greek Anthology. His epigrams are chiefly upon the great men and women of antiquity, especially the poets. One of them would seem, from its title in the Vatican MS., Διοσκορίδου Νικοπολίτου, to be the production of a later writer.

The epigrams of Dioscorides were included in the Garland of Meleager.

References

Notes

Citations

Bibliography 

 Salazar, Christine F., ed. (2006). "Dioscorides (3)". In Brill's New Pauly: Encyclopaedia of the Ancient World. Brill Publishers.
 Smith, Philip (1867). "Dioscorides (6)". In Smith, William (ed.). Dictionary of Greek and Roman Biography and Mythology. Vol. 1. Boston: Little, Brown, & Co.

Ancient Greek poets
Hellenistic-era people
Epigrammatists of the Greek Anthology